Yuan Wenqing (born 1966) is a retired professional wushu taolu athlete from Shanxi, China. Nicknamed 'the prince of wushu,'  he was known for his explosive speed and power, and is still widely regarded as one of the greatest wushu practitioners of all time. It is said that in the sport of wushu, the 1970s belonged to Jet Li, the 1980s to Zhao Changjun, and the 1990s to Yuan Wenqing.

Career

Early career 
Yuan started practicing wushu at around the age of eight. In 1978, he joined the Shanxi Provincial Wushu Team and began to train under Pang Lin Tai and later Zhang Ling Mei.

Rise to stardom 
In 1982, he won his first national championship gold medal which was in shuangdao. After having several more national championship victories, he was chosen to compete in the 1989 Asian Wushu Championships where he achieved a gold medal sweep to win the men's all around title. Yuan was then chosen by the Chinese Wushu Association to aid them in choreographing the first set of compulsory routines to be used by the International Wushu Federation. The CWA used his changquan and gunshu routines and made minor adjustments to make them easier to execute, and the routines were later recorded by Yuan the same year.

A year later in 1990, Yuan competed in the 1990 Asian Games in Beijing, wushu's inaugural debut at the Asian Games, and won the gold medal in men's changquan. Yuan then competed in the 1993 National Games of China with much success. Later that year, he competed in the 1993 World Wushu Championships and became the world champion in men's daoshu. He returned to the 1994 Asian Games in Hiroshima, Japan, and won once again in men's changquan despite a recent injury.

He briefly retired from competitive wushu and acted in Iron Monkey 2 alongside Donnie Yen in 1996. He returned to competition in 1997 by request of his coach, Pang Lin Tai, who wished to have a successful competitive season during his last year as coach of the team. Yuan was chosen to compete in the 1997 World Wushu Championships in Rome, Italy, where he became the world champion in changquan. His last competition was the 1997 National Games of China where he won gold medals in changquan and daoshu/gunshu combined. He finally announced his formal retirement from wushu at the age of 31. In 2004, Yuan opened a wushu school in Shanxi.

Legacy 
In the World Wushu Championships, Yuan's changquan and gunshu routines were used from 1993 to 2001. His routines are still used by Group B athletes who compete in the World Junior Wushu Championships since the event's conception in 2006.

Film 
Yuan Wenqing co-starred alongside Donnie Yen in the 1996 film Iron Monkey 2, directed by Yuen Woo-Ping. In the film, Wenqing played the character Jin, a peasant with extraordinary martial prowess who gets embroiled in an arms smuggling plot.

Personal life 
Yuan Wenqing is a cousin of Yuan Xindong and an uncle of Yuan Xiaochao, both of which were also members of the Shaanxi Provincial Wushu Team.

See also 

 List of Asian Games medalists in wushu

References

External links 
 Changquan performance at the 1990 Asian Games

Chinese wushu practitioners
Living people
Sportspeople from Shanxi
Asian Games medalists in wushu
Wushu practitioners at the 1990 Asian Games
Wushu practitioners at the 1994 Asian Games
Articles containing video clips
Asian Games gold medalists for China
Medalists at the 1990 Asian Games
Medalists at the 1994 Asian Games
1966 births